Rautas is a village in Kiruna municipality, Norrbotten, Sweden.

It has (2007) 27 inhabitants
.
It is located at the European route E10 and Malmbanan between Kiruna and Narvik.
Rautas lies on an island, Rávttassuolo, between two branches of the Rautas River.
From here a snowmobile trail leads to Rautasjaure.

References

Populated places in Kiruna Municipality
Lapland (Sweden)